Valter Neeris (21 March 1915 – 30 December 1942) was an Estonian footballer. He played in 34 matches for the Estonia national football team from 1934 to 1940. He was also named in Estonia's squad for the Group 1 qualification tournament for the 1938 FIFA World Cup.

Neeris was conscripted into the Red Army during World War II and killed in action during the Battle of Velikiye Luki in 1942.

References

External links
 

1915 births
1942 deaths
Estonian footballers
Estonia international footballers
Association football defenders
Footballers from Tallinn
Soviet military personnel killed in World War II